Darshna Vaghela is a Bharatiya Janata Party politician and Deputy Mayor of Ahmedabad, India. she won election from asarwa constituency of ahmedabad Gujarat

References

 2. https://hindi.news18.com/news/nation/asarwa-vidhansabha-seat-result-live-update-gujarat-election-result-darshna-m-vaghela-vipul-parmar-jayantibhai-mevada-bjp-aap-congress-loser-winner-5011629.html

Living people
Women in Gujarat politics
Politicians from Ahmedabad
Bharatiya Janata Party politicians from Gujarat
Year of birth missing (living people)